Neda Ukraden (born 16 August 1950) is a Serbian singer. Her professional career stretches back to 1967.

Personal life
Ukraden was born in Glavina Donja, a village near the small Croatian town of Imotski, to Serb parents Anđelija (1924–2018) and Dušan Ukraden (1927–1997).

She lived in Imotski with her grandparents until the age of two when she relocated to Višegrad, in eastern Bosnia and Herzegovina. When she was in elementary school, her family moved to Sarajevo where she lived until 1992 when the Bosnian War broke out.

When the war started, Neda moved to Belgrade, Serbia. Between 1992 and 1996, she rented an apartment in Vienna, Austria.

Respecting the wishes of her father, she attended the University of Sarajevo where she successfully completed degrees in Law, Philology, and the English language. It was only at age 17 that she started singing.

Ukraden was married to director Milan Bilbija and together they had a daughter named Jelena. Bilbija died on 30 January 2013 in Montenegro. Ukraden did not attend his funeral.

Discography

7" singles

Sve što moje srce zna / Ako me trebaš (1969)
Jel' to taj / Tri djevojke (1973)
Pjesma Maršalu Titu / A.V.N.O.J. (1975)
Srdce u srcu / Mezarje (1975)
Što si nano udala me rano / Sretan dan (1975)
Novi Robinzoni / Do posljednje kapi života (1975)
Ja još pamtim samo tvoje ime / Neka suze kažu mili (1976)
Ej, da mi je naći / Večera (1976)
Ja i ti / 8 dana (1976)
Ne dam ga, ne dam / Dragana je mala na livadu zvala (1977)
Požuri mi dragane / Šalvare (1977)
Hajde bolan ne luduj / Što su polju cvijetovi (1977)
Pisma ljubavi / Ljubav me čudno dira (1978)
Vjeruj mi dušo moja / Alčak (1978)
Što si bliže meni / Kad sam bila cvijeće u Japanu (1979)
Još te volim / Šeherzada (1979)
Umrie ljeto / Ljubavi, ljubavi (1981)
Oženjen je / Sve što se odgađa, to se ne događa (1981)
Ne budi me noćas / Za tri dana prođe svako čudo (1982)
Doviđenja, zaboravi ne / Ne vjeruj (1983)
Boli, boli / Sretno ti bilo, sine (1988)

Studio albums

Srce u srcu (1975)
Ko me to od nekud doziva (1976)
Nedine najljepše pjesme (1977)
Neda (1978)
Neda (1979)
Čuje se glas (1981)
To mora da je ljubav (1982)
Oči tvoje govore (1984)
Hoću tebe (1985)
Šaj, šaj (1986)
10 Hitova (1986)
Došlo doba da se rastajemo (1987)
Posluži nas srećo (1988)
Ponoć je (1988)
Dobro došli (1989)
Poslije nas (1990)
Nek živi muzika (1992)
Jorgovan (1993)
Između ljubavi i mržnje (1995)
Ljubav žedna (1996)
Nova Neda (2001)
Život sam promjenila (2002)
Ljubomora (2004)
Za sva vremena (2004)
Oduži mi se poljupcima (2006)
Da se nađemo na pola puta (2009)
Radujte se prijatelji (2010)
Biti svoja (2012)
Terapija (2016)
Jednom kad ovo prođe (2021)

References

External links

Official website
Discography at Discogs

1950 births
Living people
People from Imotski
Serbs of Croatia
Yugoslav women singers
20th-century Serbian women singers
21st-century Serbian women singers
20th-century Croatian women singers
21st-century Croatian women singers
Serbian folk-pop singers
Croatian folk-pop singers
Grand Production artists
BN Music artists
Bosnia and Herzegovina emigrants to Serbia
University of Sarajevo alumni
Beovizija contestants